Corton Cliffs is a  geological Site of Special Scientific Interest north of Lowestoft in Suffolk. It is a Geological Conservation Review site.

This is described by Natural England as a "nationally important" site, as it is the type locality for the Anglian glaciation around 450,000 years ago. The Anglian was the most extreme ice age of the Pleistocene epoch. The site displays the complete Anglian sequence and its relation to the preceding Cromerian stage.

The site is a public beach.

References

Sites of Special Scientific Interest in Suffolk
Geological Conservation Review sites